William Ingram Bryant (1 March 1899 – 21 January 1986) was an English international footballer who played club football for Clapton and Millwall. Born in Ghent, Belgium, Bryant played as a centre half.

Whilst a Clapton player Bryant was capped by England, in a match against France in May 1925. It was to be his only England appearance.

Bryant first played a Football League match for Millwall in the 1925–26 season and he went on to play over 130 League games for the Lions.

He died in Witham in 1986.

See also
 List of England international footballers born outside England

References

1899 births
1986 deaths
English footballers
England international footballers
Clapton F.C. players
English Football League players
Millwall F.C. players
Association football defenders